Pachyphloiidae is a family of uniserial Permian Foraminifera included in the fusulinid superfamily Geinitzinacea along with the Geinitzinidae. Three genera are recognized. They are: 
Pachyphloia, type
Robustopachyphloia, 
Maichelina

Pachyphloiid genera are characterized by their free, compressed, uniserial tests with broad low chambers recurved laterally and microgranular calcareous walls with secondary lamellar thickening on both sides which distinguishes them from the ancestral Geinitzinidae.

References

A. R. Loeblich and H. Tappan. 1984. Suprageneric classification of the Foraminiferida (Protozoa). Micropaleontology 30(1):1-70 
__ __ 1988. Forminiferal Genera and their Classification. Van Nostrand Reinhold.

Foraminifera families
Permian life
Permian first appearances
Permian extinctions
Prehistoric SAR supergroup families
Fusulinida